Mary Sumner  (31 December 1828—11 August 1921) was the founder of the Mothers' Union, a worldwide Anglican women's organisation. She is commemorated in a number of provinces of the Anglican Communion on 9 August.

Early life
Mary Elizabeth Heywood was born on 31 December 1828 in Swinton near Salford, Lancashire, the third of four children. Her father Thomas Heywood was a banker and keen antiquarian; and her mother was a woman of personal piety. The family moved to Colwall near Ledbury, Herefordshire, in 1832, where Sumner's mother held mothers' meetings. A year after their arrival in Herefordshire, Sumner's six-week-old brother died. Her mother's faith, her women's meetings and her brother's infant death may have all inspired Sumner decades later to begin the Mothers' Union.

Educated at home, young Mary learned to speak three foreign languages and sing well. To complete her musical education, she travelled with her mother and elder sister to Rome. Whilst there she met her future husband, George Henry Sumner, the son of Charles Richard Sumner, the Bishop of Winchester and a relative of William Wilberforce.

The couple were married in Colwall on 26 July 1848, 18 months after George's ordination as an Anglican cleric. They had three children: Margaret, Louise and George; the latter became a well known artist.

In 1851, Rev. George Sumner received the living of Old Alresford, Hampshire, in his father's diocese. Sumner dedicated herself to raising her children and helping her husband in his ministry by providing music and Bible classes.

Mothers' Union

In 1876, when her eldest daughter Margaret gave birth, she was reminded how difficult she had found the burden of motherhood. Inspired, Sumner publicized a meeting of mothers in the parish to offer mutual support. Her plan was quite radical in its day as it involved calling women of all social classes to support one another and to see motherhood as a profession as important as those of men, if not more so. The first meeting was held in Old Alresford Rectory, but Sumner was so overcome by nervousness that her husband had to speak for her and invite the women to return next week. At that second meeting she had gathered enough courage to lead her own meeting.

The nascent Mothers' Union was limited to Sumner's parish. However, in 1885, she was part of the audience in the Portsmouth Church Congress, some 20 miles from her home. The first Bishop of Newcastle, Ernest Wilberforce, had been asked to address the women churchgoers. He felt that he had very little to say to women and invited Sumner to speak in his stead. Although nervous once again, she gave a passionate address about national morality and the importance of women's vocation as mothers to change the nation for the better. A number of the women present went back to their parishes to found mothers' meetings on Sumner's pattern. The Bishop of Winchester, Edward Browne, made the Mothers' Union a diocesan organisation.

The Mothers' Union concept spread rapidly to the dioceses of Ely, Exeter, Hereford, Lichfield and Newcastle and then throughout the United Kingdom. By 1892, 60,000 members lived in 28 dioceses, and by the turn of the century, the Mothers' Union had grown to 169,000 members. Annual general meetings began in 1893, and the Mothers' Union Central Council was formed three years later. Sumner was unanimously elected president, a post she held into her nineties. In 1897, during her Diamond Jubilee, Queen Victoria became patron of the Mothers' Union, giving it an unprecedented stamp of approval.  The Mothers' Union set up branches throughout the British Empire, beginning in New Zealand, then Canada and India. Sumner lived to lead the Mothers' Union to act in rebuilding the heart of Britain after the First World War and saw the first Mothers' Union Conference of Overseas Workers in 1920.

Death and legacy

Sumner died on 11 August 1921 at the age of 92, and is buried with her husband, who had died 12 years before, in the grounds of Winchester Cathedral.

The inscription on their tomb (from Revelation 14:13) reads: I heard a voice from Heaven saying unto me/ Write Blessed are the dead which died in the Lord from henceforth./ Here, saith the Spirit, they may rest from their labours,/ And their works do follow them.

Mary Sumner is remembered in the Church of England with a Lesser Festival on 9 August. The Church in Wales and other provinces remember Mary Sumner on 9 August, which the Mothers' Union initially (and at least one secondary source) incorrectly listed as the date of her death. Her detailed biography clearly proves from an eyewitness account the 11 August date. Another biography is wrong about the actual date of Sumner's death. Moreover, 11 August was already the liturgical feast day of another notable Christian woman, St. Clare of Assisi and it may be considered appropriate that these two distinguished women be honoured on the same day.

The Mary Sumner Chapel, named in her memory, is housed within the Mothers Union Headquarters, in a building designed by Claude W Ferrier at Tufton Street, Westminster in London.

Notes

References

Further reading

  

1828 births
1921 deaths
20th-century Christian saints
Anglican saints
British women's rights activists
Christian female saints of the Late Modern era
English Anglicans
Mary
Leaders of Christian parachurch organizations
People from Swinton, Greater Manchester